The 52nd New Brunswick Legislative Assembly was created following a general election in 1991 and was dissolved on August 12, 1995.

Leadership

The speaker from its first meeting until April 25, 1994, was Shirley Dysart, Dysart stepped down as speaker at the request of the government who wanted to appoint Gérald Clavette as speaker.   When the legislature met in the fall, Clavette was appointed speaker by motion and shortly thereafter the House adopted new rules to elect the speaker by secret ballot.  Clavette resigned to re-seek the office of Speaker under the new rules and was defeated by Dysart who returned to the speakership for the balance of the life of the assembly. 

Premier Frank McKenna led the government for the life of the assembly.

The opposition was led for the life of the assembly by Danny Cameron, despite various changes in Cameron's status as leader of the New Brunswick Confederation of Regions Party.  In 1994, when there became an equality of members (six each) between CoR and the Progressive Conservatives, the Speaker ruled that CoR would retain its position as the official opposition. 

Dennis Cochrane led the Progressive Conservatives for the life of the assembly.

Elizabeth Weir led the New Democrats for the life of the assembly.

Members

All were elected in the 32nd general election held on September 11, 1991, except for
 John Lebans elected in a by-election on February 15, 1993
 Dale Graham elected in a by-election on June 28, 1993
 Percy Mockler elected in a by-election on November 29, 1993
 Elvy Robichaud elected in a by-election on September 26, 1994

Three members left their respective caucuses over the course of the assembly to sit as independents:
 Beverly Brine, a former Confederation of Regions member
 Brent Taylor, a former Confederation of Regions member
 Jean Gauvin, a former Progressive Conservative

Members at dissolution

Italics denotes a party leader
† denotes the Speaker

Former members
Fred Harvey, a Liberal, was first elected to the legislature in the 1987 election, resigned after being convicted of election fraud.
Michael McKee, a Liberal, was first elected to the legislature in the 1974 election, resigned after being appointed a judge.
Pierrette Ringuette, a Liberal, was first elected to the legislature in the 1987 election, resigned after being elected to the House of Commons of Canada.
Denis Losier, a Liberal, was first elected to the legislature in a 1988 by-election and resigned in 1994.
John Lebans, a Liberal, was first elected to the legislature in a 1993 by-election, he resigned on June 26, 1995

See also
1991 New Brunswick general election
Legislative Assembly of New Brunswick

References 

 Elections in New Brunswick 1984–2006, Elections New Brunswick  (pdf)

Terms of the New Brunswick Legislature
1991 establishments in New Brunswick
1995 disestablishments in New Brunswick
20th century in New Brunswick